JS Kuroshio (SS-596) is the seventh boat of the s. She was commissioned on 8 March 2004.

Construction and career
Kuroshio was laid down at Kawasaki Heavy Industries Kobe Shipyard on 27 March 2000 and launched on 23 October 2003. She was commissioned on 8 March 2004 and deployed to Kure.

The vessel participated in RIMPAC 2006 from 26 June to 28 July 2006.

On 15 March 2011, she was transferred to the 3rd Submarine Group of the 1st Submarine Group.

From 23 September to 19 December 2015, she participated in RIMPAC 2015.

On 27 August 2018, she left Kure and entered the South China Sea through the Bashi Channel between Taiwan and the Philippines. After that, she joined three ships including the escort ship  of the Indo-Pacific dispatch training unit, and conducted anti-submarine warfare training in the South China Sea on 13 September. After that, from 17–21 September, the vessel called at the Port of Cam Ranh, Vietnam and carried out a goodwill visit to the Vietnam Navy submarine unit.

Gallery

Citations

External links

2002 ships
Oyashio-class submarines
Ships built by Kawasaki Heavy Industries